Gena Desouza (Thai: จีน่า เดอซูซ่า) is a Thai singer and actress. She is known from the "MBO THE AUDITION หน้าใหม่ พร้อมเกิด" project of MBO Teen Entertainment under the network of GMM Grammy and debut with an official solo single, "จริง ๆ มันก็ดี (Drunk)".

Early life and education 
Gena Desouza, born Natcha Desouza, was born on May 2, 1997.

The beginning in the music industry of "Jeena D." started from her posted her cover song clips on socialcam. Then a team of Classy Records found her clips. She was approached to sing for the album "Matters in February" in 2013, singing in the song "อาย (Shy)".

After that, Jeena participated "MBO THE AUDITION" project. She was chosen by Sis Four (Sakonrut Woraurai), and later became one of the MBO artists under GMM Grammy. Jeena D. has a solo single of her own in the title song. "จริงๆมันก็ดี (Drunk)"

Education, Graduated high school from Mater Dei School. At present, studying bachelor's degrees at the 3rd year in Faculty of Communication Arts, Advertising, Bangkok University.

Workings

Solo single

Participation song

Ost.

Album 
 "Matters in February" album of Classy Records, singing a song "อาย" (2014)

Advertising

Series

MC 
 Online 
 2019 : Stalk me ep.1 On Air YouTube:GENA DESOUZA

References

External links
 

Gena Desouza
Gena Desouza
Gena Desouza
Living people
1997 births
Gena Desouza
Gena Desouza
Gena Desouza
Gena Desouza